Juventigulella amboniensis is a species of very small air-breathing land snails, terrestrial pulmonate gastropod mollusks in the family Streptaxidae.

Distribution
This species is endemic to Tanzania. Its natural habitat is subtropical or tropical dry forests. It is threatened by habitat loss.

References 

 Tattersfield, P. (1998). Three new species and a new subgenus of Gulella (Gastropoda: Streptaxidae) from Tanzania. Journal of Conchology, 36 (2): 31-41. London.

Endemic fauna of Tanzania
Fauna of Tanzania
amboniensis
Gastropods described in 1998
Taxonomy articles created by Polbot
Taxobox binomials not recognized by IUCN